The Taiwanese Representative Office in Lithuania is the representative office of Taiwan responsible for the development of relations with Lithuania. As Lithuania has not established official diplomatic relations with Taiwan, the mission does not have diplomatic status but can be considered as a de facto embassy. It is Taiwan's first representative office with "Taiwan" instead of "Taipei" in its title in a European country without official relations with Taiwan, and the first such office in the world that uses the adjective "Taiwanese". 

In response to its opening, the People's Republic of China (PRC), which sees Taiwan as part of its territory, has imposed a series of sanctions on Lithuania in retaliation.

History 
Closer relations between Lithuania and Taiwan began to develop more actively after 2020 at the end of the Seimas elections. The agreement of the ruling coalition set out to increase support for Taiwan. Gabrielius Landsbergis, the new Minister of Foreign Affairs announced discussions on the Lithuanian business representative office in Taiwan, and a few months later on plans to open a Taiwanese representative office in Lithuania.

Present 
Eric Huang, head of Taiwan's representative office in Lithuania, has announced that Taiwan will create an investment of 200 million USD fund, which will be used for investments in the Lithuanian industry. And the country has already announced that it has taken over or promises to take over 120 sea containers with Lithuanian goods that China did not allow to enter mainland China.

Heads 
Heads of the Taiwanese Representative office in Vilnius:
 Eric Huang (黃鈞耀), since November 18, 2021.

See also
 Lithuania-Taiwan relations
 Ministry of Foreign Affairs (Taiwan)
 Ministry of Foreign Affairs (Lithuania)

References

Lithuania
Taiwan
Lithuania–Taiwan relations
2021 establishments in Lithuania
Organizations established in 2021